Riverdale is an unincorporated community located in Grenada County, Mississippi and part of the Grenada Micropolitan Statistical Area . Riverdale is located within the city limits of Grenada along U.S. Route 51 and Interstate 55.

References

Unincorporated communities in Grenada County, Mississippi
Unincorporated communities in Mississippi